O-I was the name given to a proposed series of Japanese super-heavy tanks, to be used in the Pacific Theater. The vehicle was planned to be very heavy and have a crew of 11. The complete history of the O-I is unknown, due to the “obscure” nature of the project and the limited documentation known to have survived post-war.

History and development
After the Battles of Khalkhin Gol against the Soviet Union in 1939, Japan tried to improve their tank designs using lessons learned from this battle. Many Japanese tanks such as the Type 95 Ha-Go light tank and the Type 97 Chi-Ha medium tanks were proven to be insufficient to counter Soviet armored forces. A larger tank design was urgently needed. A super heavy tank project was proposed directly in response to the Japanese defeat at Khalkhin Gol.

In early 1940, Hideo Iwakuro, a colonel with the Army Ministry of Japan (陸軍省 Rikugun-shō) ordered the Army Engineering Division to develop a new super heavy tank. Colonel Iwakuro indicated that the new tank should be at least two times larger than the current Type 95 Heavy Tank (26 tonnes). The general outer appearance design was not dissimilar to the Type 95 Heavy Tank. The proposed 100 ton prototype was to be equipped with a Type 92 105 mm cannon for its main gun.

The development process was restarted by the Mitsubishi Heavy Industries Tokyo Machinery Division on the 120 ton version under the designation "Mi-To" (for Mitsubishi -Tokyo). Later it was given the official designation of the "O-I tank" (オイ車). "オ" is an abbreviation of "大き"(big or large) and "イ" in Japanese army nomenclature, refers to model number 1, from the old Japanese alphabet iroha. The tank was again to be equipped with a Type 92 105 mm cannon for its main gun. Its two smaller front hull turrets were designed to be "offset slightly left from the mid-point". One turret was designed to carry a Type 1 47 mm tank gun as secondary armament. The other turret was to carry a 7.7 mm machine gun. The rear hull was designed to have two more smaller turrets each with a 7.7 mm machine gun.

One of the main features of the O-I tank was its thick armor. Its armor had a maximum thickness of up to 200 mm, as well as 35 mm +75 mm plates on its sides and 150 mm at the back. The tank was to have two V-12 petrol-fueled aircraft engines designed by BMW in Germany and licensed to Kawasaki Heavy Industries in Japan. This was the same engine used in the Type 5 Chi-Ri medium tank. The engines were mounted "lengthwise parallel to each other" in the rear hull.

According to historian Steven Zaloga, there were "rumors that work was underway" on the 120-ton version, but no known documentation survived the war. According to Akira Takizawa, one prototype of 120 tons was completed in 1943. However, the tank was "unpractical" and the project terminated. According to Kenneth Estes, the O-I project was cancelled before the 120+ ton prototype was completed. According to another source, the model kit company FineMolds in Japan bought some original documents and plans of the O-I. The source also contends that the proposed 100 ton design and "140-150" ton design are "incorrect representations of the O-I". A tank track from the project is on display at the JGSDF Fuji School in Japan. In the end, the complete history of the O-I prototype is unknown due to the project's obscure nature and the limited documentation known to have survived post-war.

Gallery

Notes

References

External links
Taki’s Imperial Japanese Army Page: Super-Heavy Tank "O-I" - Akira Takizawa

Super-heavy tanks
World War II tanks of Japan
History of the tank